The Dieng Volcanic Complex is a volcanic complex located on the Dieng Plateau in the Central Java, Indonesia, a complex of volcanoes. The volcanic complex consists of two or more of stratovolcanoes, more than 20 small craters and Pleistocene-to-Holocene age volcanic cones. It covers over 6 × 14 km area.  The Prahu stratovolcano was truncated by a large Pleistocene caldera and then filled by parasitic cones, lava domes and craters which is 120 Celsius.  Some of them are turned into lakes. Toxic volcanic gas has caused fatalities and is a hazard at several craters. On 20 February 1979 149 people died of gas poisoning in Pekisaran village on the plateau near the Sinila crater. The area is also home to a major geothermal project.

See also 

 List of volcanoes in Indonesia
 Dieng Plateau
 Dieng temples

References

External links 
 Articles about the Dieng Plateau

Stratovolcanoes of Indonesia
Mountains of Central Java
Complex volcanoes
Volcanic plateaus
Active volcanoes of Indonesia
Volcanoes of Central Java
Pleistocene stratovolcanoes
Holocene stratovolcanoes